The music of the Cook Islands is diverse. Christian music is extremely popular.  Imene tuki is a form of unaccompanied vocal music known for a uniquely Polynesian drop in pitch at the end of the phrases, as well as staccato rhythmic outbursts of nonsensical syllables (tuki). The word 'imene' is derived from the English word 'hymn' (see Tahitian: 'himene' - Tahiti was first colonised by the English). Likewise the harmonies and tune characteristics / 'strophe patterns' of much of the music of Polynesia is western in style and derived originally from missionary influence via hymns and other church music. One unique quality of Polynesian music (it has become almost a cliché) is the use of the sustained 6th chord in vocal music, though typically the 6th chord is not used in religious music. Traditional songs and hymns are referred to as imene metua (lit. hymn of the parent/ancestor).

Traditional dance is the most prominent art form of the Cook Islands. Each island has its own unique dances that are taught to all children, and each island is home to several annual competitions. Traditional dances are generally accompanied by the drumming of the pate.

The Cook Islands drumming style is well known internationally, but is often misidentified as an example of Tahitian music. This is most uncommon as the Cook Islands have a strong connection to their Tahitian ancestry.

Harmony-singing church music and a wide variety of hymns and wedding and funeral music are found throughout the Cook Islands. There is much variation across the region, and each island has its own traditional songs.

References

Linkels, Ad. "The Real Music of Paradise". 2000. In Broughton, Simon and Ellingham, Mark with McConnachie, James and Duane, Orla (Ed.), World Music, Vol. 2: Latin & North America, Caribbean, India, Asia and Pacific, pp 218–229. Rough Guides Ltd, Penguin Books.